Shadrafa (or Shadrapa, šdrpʾ, šdrbʾ,  σατραπας, i.e. "satrap") is a poorly-attested Canaanite (Punic) god of healing or medicine.

His cult is attested in the Roman era (c. 1st to 3rd centuries) in Amrit and Palmyra in the Levant and in Carthage and Leptis Magna in Africa. He is sometimes depicted as a youth with a serpent or a scorpion. 
In a Punic-Latin bilingual in Leptis Magna he is identified with Liber-Dionysus.
Various scholarly suggestions have Palmyran šdrpʾ to Heracles, Asclepios, Eshmun, Adonis, Nergol, Melqart and Resheph. It seems probable that Shadrafa arises from Hellenistic-Canaanite syncretism, and may represent an interpretatio punica of a Hellenistic deity.

References

De Shadrafa, dieu de Palmyre, à Baal Shamīm, dieu de Hatra, aux IIe et IIIe siècles après J.-C (1962)
Collart, Paul, "Nouveau monument palmyrénien de Shadrafa",  Museum Helveticum 13 (1956), 209–215.
Edward Lipiński, "Shadday, Shadrapha et le dieu Satrape", Zeitschrift für Althebraistik 8 (1995),  247–274.
Paolo Xella, Edward Lipiński, "Shadrapha" in: Edward Lipiński (ed.), Dictionnaire de la Civilisation Phénicienne et Punique (1992),  407–408.

Further reading

External links
BM 125206 (limestone stela to Shadrafa from Palmyra, dated AD 55), britishmuseum.org

West Semitic gods
Hellenistic Asian deities
Health gods
Palmyra
Phoenician mythology